The 1970 UNLV Rebels football team was an American football team that represented the University of Nevada, Las Vegas as an independent during the 1970 NCAA College Division football season. In their third year under head coach Bill Ireland, the team compiled a record of 6–4.

Schedule

References

UNLV
UNLV Rebels football seasons
UNLV Rebels football